Patrick Phungwayo (born 6 January 1988 in Alexandra, Transvaal) is a South African Association football player who last played as a left-back for Free State Stars in the Premier Soccer League.

Club career

Orlando Pirates
He joined Orlando Pirates on 26 June 2012. In May 2017, he was arrested after seven days on the run, eventually handing himself in, and charged with assault and attempted murder. He and his brother were later released on R2000 bail. He featured for Orlando Pirates in the Carling Black Label Cup at the start of the following season but was released by the club on 29 August 2017 after mutual agreement was reached for the termination of his contract.

References

External links

1988 births
Living people
People from Alexandra, Gauteng
South African soccer players
South African expatriate soccer players
Association football defenders
Bidvest Wits F.C. players
Panionios F.C. players
Orlando Pirates F.C. players
Free State Stars F.C. players
Super League Greece players
South African Premier Division players
2015 Africa Cup of Nations players
Expatriate footballers in Greece
South African expatriate sportspeople in Greece
Sportspeople from Gauteng